Ingrid Grant (born 16 October 1964 in Haddington, East Lothian) is a British former alpine skier who competed in the 1988 Winter Olympics.

References

External links
 

1964 births
Living people
Scottish female alpine skiers
Olympic alpine skiers of Great Britain
Alpine skiers at the 1988 Winter Olympics
People from Haddington, East Lothian
Sportspeople from East Lothian
Universiade medalists in alpine skiing
Universiade bronze medalists for Great Britain
Competitors at the 1991 Winter Universiade